Mount Gould is a mountain in the Central Highlands region of Tasmania, Australia. Situated within the Cradle Mountain-Lake St Clair National Park, the mountain is a major feature of the national park, and is a popular venue with bushwalkers and mountain climbers.

See also

 List of highest mountains of Tasmania

References

External links
 Parks Tasmania
 

Mountains of Tasmania
Central Highlands (Tasmania)
Cradle Mountain-Lake St Clair National Park